AccessKenya Group is a Kenyan company specializing on internet service provision, with headquarters at Purshottam Place in the Westlands suburb of Nairobi.

It is a wholly owned subsidiary of Dimension Data Holdings.

Overview 
Access Kenya Group comprises Communications Solutions, Broadband Access (Blue), and Openview Business Systems. The Group has 6,000+ corporate leased lines across Kenya and employs over 400 people mainly stationed in Nairobi, Mombasa, Kisumu, Nakuru and Eldoret.

History 
Access Kenya Group was founded in 1995 by brothers David and Jonathan Somen to provide information and communications technology for corporate clients within Kenya, under the name Communications Solutions Limited. The company changed its name in 2000 to AccessKenya.

In April 2007, AccessKenya performed an initial public offering (IPO) of stock on the Nairobi Securities Exchange (NSE), becoming Kenya's first publicly listed ICT company.

In 2007, AccessKenya Group acquired OpenView Business Systems. In February 2009, AccessKenya acquired Satori Solutions, a mid-sized virtual ISP to help promote the sale of the group's new SoHo service which is focused on the small and home office market. As at February 2008, AccessKenya had a corporate client base of 3000; a residential base of 1500, and small/medium enterprises base of 125.

In June 2013, the AccessKenya Group received a take over bid from Dimension Data Holdings for 100% of the stock that would lead to the delisting of the stock from the Nairobi Securities Exchange. The offer received irrevocable undertaking from the three founders representing 30.28% of the voting rights. The offer was accepted by the shareholders at an extraordinary meeting and the company exited the securities exchange in November of the same year.

Following the buyout, AccessKenya merged with Internet Solutions Kenya Limited, a Dimension Data Group subsidiary.

Companies within the AccessKenya Group hold four licenses from Communications Authority of Kenya (CA) including DCNO, ISP, PDNO, and Local Loop Operator licenses.

In February 2018, AccessKenya officially re-branded to Internet Solutions Kenya.

Subsidiaries and Investments 
The companies that comprise the AccessKenya Group include, but are not limited, to the following:
 Communication Solutions Limited - 100% Shareholding
 Broadband Access Limited - 100% Shareholding
 Access IT Limited (formally Openview Business Systems) - 100% Shareholding
 TEAMS Kenya Limited - 1.8% Shareholding

Governance 
AccessKenya Group is governed by a seven-person Board of Directors with Daniel Ndonye serving as the Chairman of the group and Richard Hechle as the Group CEO.

References

Telecommunications companies of Kenya
Telecommunications companies established in 1995
Companies formerly listed on the Nairobi Securities Exchange
Companies based in Nairobi
1995 establishments in Kenya